Tan Yang (born 28 February 1999) is a Chinese footballer currently playing as a midfielder for Sichuan Jiuniu.

Club career
Having moved to Portugal to join Vizela, Tan returned to China in 2019 to join Sichuan Jiuniu on loan. He would return to Sichuan Jiuniu on a permanent basis following his release from Vizela, before being loaned again; this time to Yanbian Longding.

Career statistics

Club
.

Notes

References

1999 births
Living people
Footballers from Chongqing
Chinese footballers
China youth international footballers
Association football midfielders
Campeonato de Portugal (league) players
China League Two players
F.C. Vizela players
Sichuan Jiuniu F.C. players
Chinese expatriate footballers
Chinese expatriate sportspeople in Portugal
Expatriate footballers in Portugal